Thomas Dutton (10 November 1906–1982) was an English professional footballer who played in the Football League for Doncaster Rovers, Mansfield Town and Queens Park Rangers.

References

1906 births
1982 deaths
English footballers
Association football forwards
English Football League players
Southport F.C. players
Chorley F.C. players
West Bromwich Albion F.C. players
Leicester City F.C. players
Queens Park Rangers F.C. players
Doncaster Rovers F.C. players
Rochdale A.F.C. players
Mansfield Town F.C. players